Francisco Antonio Andrés Sancho (27 April 1913 – 24 January 1985) was a Spanish professional road racing cyclist. Professional from 1935 to 1947, he won the Spanish National Road Race Championships, the Volta a Catalunya and three stages of the Vuelta a España, in addition to numerous other races.

Major results

1935
 4th Overall Volta a Catalunya
1939
 1st  National Road Race Championships
 1st  Overall Vuelta a Aragón
1st Stages 1 & 5
 7th Overall Volta a Catalunya
1940
 1st  Overall Trofeo Masferrer
1st Stage 1a
 2nd Overall Vuelta a Cantabria
 7th Overall Volta a Catalunya
1941
 1st  National Road Race Championships
 1st  Overall Volta a Catalunya
 2nd Trofeo Masferrer
 5th Overall Vuelta a España
1st Stage 7
1942
 2nd National Road Race Championships
 3rd Trofeo Masferrer
 3rd Overall Vuelta a España
1st Stage 14
1943
 1st  Overall Vuelta a Levante
 2nd Overall Trofeo Masferrer
1944
 1st  Overall Trofeo Masferrer
1st Stage 1b
1946
 2nd National Road Race Championships
 7th Overall Vuelta a España
1st Stage 2b

References

External links

1913 births
1985 deaths
Spanish male cyclists
Spanish Vuelta a España stage winners
Sportspeople from the Province of Valencia
Cyclists from the Valencian Community